Hoseynabad-e Qashqai (also Romanized as Ḩoseynābād-e Qashqā’ī; also known as Ḩoseynābād) is a village in Behnamarab-e Jonubi Rural District, Javadabad District, Varamin County, Tehran Province, Iran. At the 2006 census, its population was 46, in 7 families.

References 

Populated places in Varamin County